Per Michael Johansen (born 1960) is a Danish engineer and physicist and the current rector of Aalborg University (AAU).

Early life 

Johansen was born in 1960 in the small holiday and fishing village Agger in the Thy district, which is located in the northwestern part of Jutland in Denmark. He graduated from high school in Thisted in 1980. He subsequently studied Technical Physics (Engineering) at Aalborg University and holds a master's degree within this particular field which he was awarded in 1986. In addition to his master's degree he also holds a PhD (awarded in 1989) and a title of Doctor of Science in physics (awarded in 2001).

Academic career  

After graduating his PhD, Johansen first worked at Aalborg University (AAU) for a short period at the Department of Physics. Later, he was employed as a researcher at Risø DTU National Laboratory for Sustainable Energy for a number of years. In 2005, he became Director of Svendborg International Maritime Academy. After his job as director, he became the Dean of the Faculty of Engineering at the University of Southern Denmark for seven years. In 2014, he took over the title and job as rector at Aalborg University (AAU) from his predecessor Finn Kjærsdam.

References 

Living people
Academic staff of Aalborg University
1960 births
Aalborg University alumni
Academic staff of the University of Southern Denmark